The Empúries Marathon (Catalan: Marató d'Empúries) is a long-distance run (42.195 km) which takes place in Empúries, the ancient Greek and Roman colony, next Sant Martí d'Empúries and L'Escala in Girona (Catalonia). The first edition of the marathon was held in 2003 to mark the collaboration of the City of L'Escala with the Universal Forum of Cultures in Barcelona 2004.

Organized by the L'Escala Town Council and with the support of the Catalan Athletics Federation, the Empúries Marathon is held annually in the month of April or May, along with two additional athletics races: the half-marathon and 10,000-meter race. With over 1,847 athletes for the three tests in 2013 edition, the start and finish are performed at the Archaeology Museum of Catalonia-Empúries, and, just before the race started, the runners cross the ancient Greek city of Empúries to the starting position.

Winners 

List of the winners of the Empúries Marathon.

The current course records of 2:23:45 (men) and 3:02:01 (women) are set in 2012 by Sergio Enriquez Castells and in 2006 by Anna Rosa Moreno respectively.

Key:

References

External links 
 Web Empúries Marathon
 Miquel Cucurull route explanation of Empúries Marathon
 Archaeology Museum of Catalonia-Empúries

Marathons in Spain
Sport in Girona
Athletics competitions in Catalonia
Athletics competitions in Spain
Recurring sporting events established in 2003
Spring (season) events in Spain